Oligolophus is a genus of the harvestman family Phalangiidae with four described species.

Species
 Oligolophus mollis L. Koch (unidentifiable)
 Oligolophus hansenii (Kraepelin, 1896) (Denmark)
 Oligolophus tridens (C. L. Koch, 1836) (central Europe)
 Oligolophus tienmushanensis Wang, 1941 (China)

Harvestmen
Arachnids of Europe